Histone chaperone ASF1B is a protein that in humans is encoded by the ASF1B gene.

Function 

This gene encodes a member of the H3/H4 family of histone chaperone proteins and is similar to the anti-silencing function-1 gene in yeast. The encoded protein is the substrate of the tousled-like kinase family of cell cycle-regulated kinases, and may play a key role in modulating the nucleosome structure of chromatin by ensuring a constant supply of histones at sites of nucleosome assembly.

Interactions 

ASF1B has been shown to interact with TLK2, CHAF1B, TLK1 and CHAF1A.

References

Further reading

External links